Sarsabz is the name of a region in a Narmak of Tehran, Iran, near HaftHoz.

External links
 HaftHoz.com, providing images of Sarsabz

Neighbourhoods in Tehran